Science (from Latin scientia, meaning "knowledge") is a systematic enterprise that builds and organizes knowledge in the form of testable explanations and predictions about the universe.

Modern science is typically divided into three major branches that consist of the natural sciences (biology, chemistry, physics, astronomy and Earth science), which study nature in the broadest sense; the social sciences (e.g. psychology, sociology, economics, history) which study people and societies; and the formal sciences (e.g. mathematics, logic, theoretical computer science), which study abstract concepts. There is disagreement, however, on the formal sciences being a science as they do not rely on empirical evidence. Disciplines that use science, such as engineering and medicine, are described as applied sciences.

A
 Acanthochronology – study of cactus spines grown in time ordered sequence.
 Acarology – study of mites and ticks.
 Aceology – science of remedies, or of therapeutics; iamatology.
 Acology – study of medical remedies.
 Acoustics – science of sound.
 Actinobiology – synonymous with radiobiology.
 Adenology – study of glands 
 Aedoeology – science of generative organs.
 Aerobiology – study of airborne organisms.
 Aerodonetics – science or study of gliding.
 Aerodynamics – dynamics of gases; science of movement in a flow of air or gas.
 Aerolithology – study of aerolites; meteorites.
 Aeropalynology – study of pollens and spores in atmosphere.
 Aerology – study of the atmosphere.
 Aeronautics – study of navigation through air or space.
 Aerostatics – science of air pressure; art of ballooning.
 Agnoiology – study of ignorance.
 Agonistics – art and theory of prize-fighting.
 Agriology – comparative study of primitive peoples.
 Agrobiology – study of plant nutrition; soil yields.
 Agroecology – study of ecological processes applied to agricultural production systems.
 Agrogeology – study of agrominerals.
 Agrology – study of agricultural soils.
 Agronomics – study of productivity of land.
 Agrostology – science or study of grasses.
 Alethiology – study of truth.
 Algedonics – science of pleasure and pain.
 Algology (botany) – study of algae.
Algology (medicine) – study of pain.
 Anaesthesiology – study of anaesthetics.
 Anatomy – study of the structure of the body.
 Andragogy – theory and practice of education of adults.
 Andrology – study of men's physiology.
 Anemology – study of wind.
 Angiology – study of blood flow and lymphatic system.
 Anthropobiology – study of human biology.
 Anthropology – study of human cultures.
 Anthrozoology – study of human-animal interaction.
 Apiology – study of bees.
 Aquatic ecology – study of aquatic environment.
 Arachnology – study of arachnids.
 Archaeology – study of human material remains.
 Archelogy – study of first principles.
 Archology – science of the origins of government.
 Areology – study of Mars.
 Aretaics – science of virtue.
 Aristology – science or art of dining.
 Aromachology – study of smell and odor.
 Arthrology – study of joints.
 Arthropodology – study of arthropods like insects and arachnids.
 Astacology – science of crayfish.
 Asteroseismology – study of star oscillations.
 Astheniology – study of diseases of weakening and aging.
 Astrobotany – study of plants in space.
 Astrobiology – study of extraterrestrial life.
 Astrodynamics – study of motion of rockets and spacecraft.
 Astrogeology – study of extraterrestrial geology.
 Astronomy – study of celestial bodies and phenomena.
 Astrophysics – study of behaviour of interstellar matter.
 Atmology – the science of aqueous vapor.
 Audiology – study of hearing.
 Autecology – study of ecology of one species.
 Autology – scientific study of oneself.
 Auxology – science of growth.
 Avionics – science of electronic devices for aircraft.
 Axiology – science of the ultimate nature of value.

B 
 Bacteriology – study of bacteria.
 Balneology – science of the therapeutic use of baths.
 Batrachology – study of frogs.
 Barodynamics – science of the support and mechanics of bridges.
 Barology – study of gravitational force.
 Bathymetry – study of underwater depth of ocean floors or lake floors.
 Batology – the study of brambles.
 Bibliology – study of books.
 Bibliotics – study of documents to determine authenticity.
 Bioecology – study of interaction of life in the environment.
 Biogeochemistry – study of chemistry of the surface of the Earth.
 Biology – study of life.
 Biochemistry – study of chemical processes within and relating to living organism.
 Biomechanics – study of the structure, function and motion of the mechanical aspects of biological systems.
 Biometrics – study of biological measurement for security purposes.
 Bionomics – study of organisms interacting in their environments.
 Biophysics – study of physics of biological phenomena.
 Biopsychology – application of the science of biology to the study of psychology.
 Biotribology – study of friction, wear and lubrication of biological systems.
 Botany – study of plants.
 Bromatology – study of food.
 Bryology – study of mosses and liverworts.

C 
 Cacogenics – study of racial degeneration.
 Caliology – study of bird's nests.
 Calorifics – study of heat.
 Cambistry – science of international exchange.
 Campanology – study of bells.
 Carcinology – study of crabs and other crustaceans.
 Cardiology – study of the heart.
 Caricology – study of sedges.
 Carpology – study of fruit.
 Cartography – science of making maps and globes.
 Castrametation – art of designing a camp.
 Catacoustics – science of echoes or reflected sounds.
 Catallactics – science of commercial exchange.
 Catechectics – art of teaching by question and answer.
 Celestial mechanics – study of motion of objects in outer space.
 Cell biology – study of the different structures and functions of both eukaryote and prokaryote cells.
 Cetology – study of whales and dolphins.
 Chalcography – art of engraving on copper or brass.
 Chalcotriptics – art of taking rubbings from ornamental brasses.
 Chaology – study of chaos or chaos theory.
 Characterology – study of development of character.
 Chemistry – study of properties and behaviours of substances.
 Chirocosmetics – beautifying the hands; art of manicure.
 Chirography – study of handwriting or penmanship.
 Chirology – study of the hands.
 Chiropody – medical science of feet.
 Chorology – science of the geographic description of anything.
 Chrematistics – study of wealth; political economy.
 Chromatics –  study of color.
 Chronobiology – study of biological rhythms.
 Chrysology – study of precious metals.
 Ciselure – art of chasing metal.
 Classical mechanics – study of motion of macroscopic objects.
 Climatology – study of climate.
 Clinology – study of aging or individual decline after maturity.
 Codicology – study of manuscripts.
 Coleopterology – study of beetles and weevils.
 Cometology – study of comets.
 Computer science – study of processes that interact with data.
 Conchology – study of shells.
 Connectomics – study of connectomes.
 Contact mechanics – study of the deformation of solids that touch each other.
 Coprology – study of feces.
 Cosmetology – study of cosmetics.
 Cosmochemistry – study of the chemical composition of matter in the universe and the processes that led to those compositions.
 Cosmology – study of the universe.
 Craniology – study of the skull.
 Criminology – study of crime and criminals.
 Cryobiology – study of life under cold conditions.
 Cryptology – study of codes.
 Cryptozoology – study of animals for whose existence there is no conclusive proof.
 Ctetology – study of the inheritance of acquired characteristics.
 Cyclonology – study of tropical cyclones, e.g. hurricanes.
 Cynology – scientific study of dogs.
 Cytology – study of living cells.

D 
 Dactyliology – study of rings.
 Dactylography – study of fingerprints.
 Dactylology – study of sign language.
 Deltiology – collection and study of picture postcards.
 Demography – study of population.
 Demology – study of human behaviour.
 Dendrochronology – study of tree rings.
 Dendrology – study of trees.
 Deontology – theory or study of moral obligation.
 Dermatoglyphics – study of skin patterns and fingerprints.
 Dermatology – study of skin.
 Desmology – study of ligaments.
 Diabology – study of devils.
 Diagraphics – art of making diagrams or drawings.
 Dialectology – study of dialects.
 Dietetics – study of prevention of health conditions and diseases through human nutrition and regulation of diet.
 Dioptrics – study of light refraction.
 Diplomatics – science of deciphering ancient writings and texts.
 Diplomatology – study of diplomats.
 Docimology – art of assaying.
 Dosiology – study of doses.
 Dynamics – study of forces and their effects on motion.
 Dysgenics – study of racial degeneration.

E  
 Ecclesiology – study of church affairs.
 Eccrinology – study of excretion.
 Ecology – study of environment.
 Economics – study of material wealth (production, distribution, and consumption of goods and services).
 Edaphology – study of soils.
 Egyptology – study of ancient Egypt.
Eidology – study of mental imagery.
 Ekistics – study of human settlement.
 Electrochemistry – study of relations between electricity and chemicals.
 Electrodynamics – study of the effects arising from the interactions of electric currents with magnets, with other currents, or with themselves.
 Electrology – study of electricity.
 Electrostatics – study of static electricity.
 Electromagnetism – study of electromagnetic force.
 Embryology – study of embryos
 Emetology – study of vomiting.
 Emmenology – study of menstruation.
 Endemiology – study of local diseases.
 Endocrinology – study of glands.
 Energetics – study of energy under transformation within various fields.
 Engineering studies – study of engineering.
 Enigmatology – study of enigmas (puzzles).
 Entomology – study of insects.
 Entozoology – study of parasites that live inside larger organisms.
 Enzymology – study of enzymes.
 Ephebiatrics – branch of medicine dealing with adolescence.
 Epidemiology – study of diseases and epidemics.
 Epileptology – study of epilepsy.
 Epistemology – study of grounds of knowledge.
 Eremology – study of deserts.
 Ergology – study of effects of work on humans.
 Ergonomics – study of people at work.
 Escapology – study of freeing oneself from constraints.
 Eschatology – study of death; final matters.
 Ethnobiology – study of dynamic relationships between peoples.
 Ethnobotany – study of a region's plants and their practical uses through the traditional knowledge of a local culture and people.
 Ethnogeny – study of origins of races or ethnic groups.
 Ethnochoreology – study of dances and its implication in culture.
 Ethnomusicology – study of comparative musical systems.
 Ethnology – study of cultures.
 Ethnomethodology – study of everyday communication and social interaction.
 Ethology – study of natural or biological character.
 Ethonomics – study of economic and ethical principles of a society.
 Etiology – science of causes, especially of disease.
 Etymology – study of origins of words.
 Euthenics – science concerned with improving living conditions.
 Exobiology – study of extraterrestrial life.
 Exoplanetology – study of exoplanets.

F                                                                                                                                                       
 Felinology – study of felines.
 Finance – science or study of money management.
 Floristry – art of cultivating and selling flowers.
 Fluid dynamics – study of flow of fluids.
 Fluid mechanics – study of fluids behaviour at rest and in motion.
 Fluid statics – study of fluids behaviour at rest.
 Fluviology – study of watercourses.
 Folkloristics – study of folklore and fables.
 Forestry – study of the creation, management, use, conservation, and repair of forests and associated resources.
 Fracture mechanics – study of the propagation of cracks in materials.
 Futurology – study of future.

G 
 Garbology – study of garbage 
 Gastroenterology – study of the digestive system
 Gastronomy – study of fine dining 
 Gemmology – study of gems and jewels 
 Gender Studies – study of gender
 Genealogy – study of descent of families 
 Genesiology – study of reproduction and heredity 
 Genetics – study of genes
 Geochemistry – study of chemistry of the earth's crust 
 Geochronology – study of measuring geological time 
 Geography – study of surface of the earth and its inhabitants 
 Geology – study of the rocks of a planet 
 Geometry – study the sizes, shapes, positions angles and dimensions of things.
 Geomorphogeny – study of the characteristics, origins, and development of land forms
 Geomorphology – study of landforms and landform evolution  
 Geoponics – study of agriculture 
 Geotechnics – study of increasing habitability of the earth 
 Geratology – study of decadence and decay 
 Gerocomy – study of old age 
 Gerontology – study of the elderly and aging
 Gigantology – study of giants 
 Glaciology – study of ice ages and glaciation 
 Glossology – study of language; study of the tongue 
 Glyptography – art of engraving on gems 
 Glyptology – study of gem engravings 
 Gnomonics – the art of measuring time using sundials 
 Gnosiology – study of knowledge; philosophy of knowledge 
 Gnotobiology – study of life in germ-free conditions 
 Graminology – study of grasses 
 Grammatology – study of systems of writing 
 Graphemics – study of systems of representing speech in writing 
 Graphology – study of handwriting 
 Gromatics – science of surveying 
 Gynaecology – study of women's physiology 
 Gyrostatics – study of rotating bodies

H 
 Haemataulics – study of movement of blood through blood vessels 
 Hagiology – study of saints 
 Halieutics – study of fishing 
 Hamartiology – study of sin 
 Harmonics – study of musical acoustics 
 Hedonics – part of ethics or psychology dealing with pleasure 
 Helcology – study of ulcers 
 Heliology – science of the sun 
 Helioseismology – study of sun's interior by observing its surface oscillations 
 Helminthology – study of worms 
 Hematology – study of blood 
Hemodynamics – study of the dynamics behind blood circulation 
 Hepatology – study of liver, gallbladder, biliary tree, and pancreas
 Heredity – study of passing of traits from parents to offspring 
 Heresiology – study of heresies 
Hermeology – study of Mercury
 Herpetology – study of reptiles and amphibians 
 Hierology – science of sacred matters 
 Hippiatrics – study of diseases of horses 
 Hippology – study of horses 
 Histology – study of the tissues of organisms 
 Histopathology – study of changes in tissue due to disease 
 Historiography – study of writing history 
 Historiology – study of history 
 Homiletics – art of preaching 
 Home Economics – deals with home and economics
 Hoplology – study of human combative behavior and performance 
 Horography – art of constructing sundials or clocks 
 Horology – science of time measurement 
 Horticulture – study of gardening 
 Hydrobiology – study of aquatic organisms 
 Hydrodynamics – study of movement in liquids 
 Hydrogeology – study of ground water 
 Hydrography – study of investigating bodies of water 
 Hydrokinetics – study of motion of fluids 
 Hydrology – study of water resources 
 Hydrometeorology – study of atmospheric moisture 
 Hydropathy – study of treating diseases with water 
 Hydrostatics – study of fluids behaviour at rest
 Hyetology – science of rainfall 
 Hygiastics – science of health and hygiene 
 Hygienics – study of sanitation; health 
 Hygiology – hygienics; study of cleanliness 
 Hygroscopy – study of humidity 
 Hygrometry – science of humidity 
 Hymnography – study of writing hymns 
 Hymnology – study of hymns 
 Hypnology – study of sleep; study of hypnosis 
 Hypsography – science of measuring heights

I 
 Iamatology – study of remedies 
 Iatrology – treatise or text on medical topics; study of medicine 
 Iatromathematics – archaic practice of medicine in conjunction with astrology 
 Ichnography – art of drawing ground plans; a ground plan 
 Ichnology – science of fossilized footprints 
 Ichthyology – study of fish 
 Iconography – study of drawing symbols 
 Iconology – study of icons; symbols 
 Ideogeny – study of origins of ideas 
 Ideology – science of ideas; system of ideas used to justify behaviour 
 Idiomology – study of idiom, jargon or dialect 
 Idiopsychology – study of the psychology of one's own mind 
 Immunochemistry – study of chemistry of the immune system
 Immunogenetics – study of genetic characteristics of immunity 
 Immunology – study of immunity 
 Immunopathology – study of immunity to disease 
 Insectology – study of insects 
 Irenology – study of peace 
 Iridology – study of the iris; diagnosis of disease based on the iris of the eye

K 
 Kalology – study of beauty 
 Karyology – study of cell nuclei
 Kinematics – study of motion 
 Kinesics – study of gestural communication 
 Kinesiology – study of human movement and posture 
 Kinetics – study of forces producing or changing motion 
 Koniology – study of atmospheric pollutants and dust 
 Ktenology – science of putting people to death 
 Kymatology – study of wave motion

L 
 Labeorphily – collection and study of beer bottle labels 
 Larithmics – study of population statistics 
 Laryngology – study of larynx 
 Lepidopterology – study of butterflies and moths 
 Leprology – study of leprosy 
 Lexicology – study of words and their meanings 
 Lexigraphy – art of definition of words 
 Lichenology – study of lichens 
 Limacology – study of slugs 
 Limnobiology – study of freshwater ecosystems 
 Limnology – study of bodies of fresh water 
 Linguistics – study of language 
 Liturgiology – study of liturgical forms and church rituals 
 Loimology – study of plagues and epidemics 
 Loxodromy – study of sailing along rhumb-lines
 Ludology – study of games

M 
 Macroeconomics – branch of economics dealing with the performance, structure, behavior, and decision-making of the whole economy
 Magirics – art of cookery 
 Magnanerie – art of raising silkworms 
 Magnetics – study of magnetism
 Magnetohydrodynamics – study of electrically conducting fluids
 Magnetostatics – study of magnetic fields in systems where the currents are steady
 Malacology – study of molluscs 
 Malariology – study of malaria 
 Mammalogy – study of mammals 
 Manège – art of horsemanship 
 Mariology – study of the Virgin Mary 
 Marine biology – study of the ocean's ecosystem
 Mastology – study of mammals 
 Mathematics – study of magnitude, number, and forms 
 Mazology – mammalogy; study of mammals 
 Mechanics – study of action of force on bodies 
 Meconology – study of or treatise concerning opium 
 Media studies – study of mass media
 Medicine – science of diagnosis, prognosis, treatment, and prevention of disease
Melissopalynology – study of honey
 Melittology – study of bees 
 Melology – study of music; musicology 
 Mereology – study of part-whole relationships 
 Mesology – ecology 
 Metallogeny – study of the origin and distribution of metal deposits 
 Metallography – study of the structure and constitution of metals 
 Metallurgy – study of alloying and treating metals 
 Metaphysics – study of principles of nature and thought 
 Metapolitics – study of politics in theory or abstract 
 Metapsychology – study of nature of the mind 
 Metascience – study of science
 Meteoritics – study of meteors 
 Meteorology – study of weather 
 Methodology – the study or description of methods 
 Methyology – study of alcohol 
 Metrics – study of versification 
 Metrology – science of weights and measures 
 Microanatomy – study of microscopic tissues
 Microbial ecology – study of microbial environment
 Microbiology – study of microscopic organisms 
 Microclimatology – study of local climates 
 Microeconomics – branch of economics that studies the behavior of individual households and firms in making decisions on the allocation of limited resources 
 Micrology – study or discussion of trivialities 
 Micropalaeontology – study of microscopic fossils 
 Microphytology – study of very small plant life 
 Microscopy – study of minute objects 
 Mineralogy – study of minerals 
 Molecular biology – study of the molecular basis of biological activity in and between cells
 Molinology – study of mills and milling 
 Momilogy – study of mummies 
 Morphology – study of forms and the development of structures 
 Muscology – study of mosses 
 Museology – study of museums 
 Musicology – study of music 
 Mycology – study of funguses 
 Myology – study of muscles 
 Myrmecology – study of ants 
 Mythology – study of myths; fables; tales

N 
 Naology – study of church or temple architecture 
 Nasology – study of the nose 
 Nautics – art of navigation 
 Necroplanetology – study of the destruction of planets
 Nematology – study of nematodes 
 Neonatology – study of newborn babies 
 Neossology – study of nestling birds 
 Nephology – study of clouds 
 Nephrology – study of the kidneys 
 Neurobiology – study of anatomy of the nervous system 
 Neuroeconomics – study of human decision making and the ability to process multiple alternatives and to choose an optimal course of action 
 Neurology – study of nervous system 
 Neuropsychology – study of relation between brain and behaviour 
 Neurypnology – study of hypnotism 
 Neutrosophy – study of the origin and nature of philosophical neutralities 
 Nomology – the science of the laws; especially of the mind 
 Noology – science of the intellect 
 Nosology – study of diseases 
 Nostology – study of senility 
 Notaphily – study and collecting of bank-notes and cheques 
 Numerology – pseudoscientific study of numbers 
 Numismatics – study of coins 
 Nymphology – study of nymphs
 Nanotechnology – study of nanite

O 
 Obstetrics – study of midwifery 
 Oceanography – study of oceans 
 Oceanology – study of oceans 
 Odontology – study of teeth 
 Odonatology– study of dragonflies and damselflies 
 Oenology – study of wines 
 Oikology – science of housekeeping 
 Olfactology – study of the sense of smell 
 Ombrology – study of rain 
 Oncology – study of tumours 
 Oneirology – study of dreams 
 Onomasiology – study of nomenclature 
 Onomastics – study of proper names 
 Ontology – science of pure being; the nature of things 
 Oology – study of eggs 
 Ophiology – study of snakes 
 Ophthalmology – study of eye diseases 
 Optics – study of light 
 Optology – study of sight 
 Optometry – science of examining the eyes 
 Orchidology – study of orchids 
 Ornithology – study of birds
 Organology (biology) – study of form, structure, development, and functions of plant or animal organs
 Organology (musicology) – study of musical instruments in relation to history, culture, construction, acoustic properties and classification
 Orology – study of mountains 
 Orthoepy – study of correct pronunciation 
 Orthography – study of spelling 
 Orthopterology – study of cockroaches 
 Oryctology – mineralogy or paleontology 
 Osmics – scientific study of smells 
 Osmology – study of smells and olfactory processes 
 Osphresiology – study of the sense of smell 
 Osteology – study of bones 
 Otology – study of the ear 
 Otorhinolaryngology – study of ear, nose and throat

P 
 Paedology – study of children 
 Paidonosology – study of children's diseases; pediatrics 
 Palaeoanthropology – study of early humans 
 Palaeobiology – study of fossil plants and animals 
 Palaeoclimatology – study of ancient climates 
 Palaeoichthyology – study of ancient fish 
 Palaeolimnology – study of ancient lakes 
 Palaeontology – study of fossils 
 Palaeopedology – study of early soils 
 Paleobotany – study of ancient plants 
 Paleo-osteology – study of ancient bones 
 Palynology – study of pollen 
 Papyrology – study of paper 
 Paradoxology – study of paradoxes 
 Parapsychology – study of unexplained mental phenomena 
 Parasitology – study of parasites 
 Paroemiology – study of proverbs 
 Parthenology – study of virgins 
 Pataphysics – science of imaginary solutions 
 Pathology – study of disease 
 Patrology – study of early Christianity 
 Pedagogics – study of teaching 
 Pedology – study of soils 
 Pelology – study of mud 
 Penology – study of crime and punishment 
 Periodontics – study of gums 
 Peristerophily – pigeon-collecting 
 Pestology – science of pests 
 Petrology – study of rocks 
 Pharmacognosy – study of drugs of animal and plant origin 
 Pharmacology – study of drugs 
 Pharology – study of lighthouses 
 Pharyngology – study of the throat 
 Phenology – study of organisms as affected by climate 
 Phenomenology – study of phenomena 
 Philematology – act or study of kissing 
 Phillumeny – collecting of matchbox labels 
 Philology – study of ancient texts; historical linguistics 
 Philosophy – science of knowledge or wisdom 
 Phoniatrics – study and correction of speech defects 
 Phonology – study of speech sounds 
 Photobiology – study of effects of light on organisms 
 Photonics – study of photons
 Phraseology – study of phrases 
 Phrenology – study of bumps on the head 
 Phycology – study of algae and seaweeds 
 Physics – study of properties of matter, force and energy 
 Physiology – study of processes of life 
 Phytology – study of plants; botany 
 Piscatology – study of fishes 
 Pisteology – science or study of faith 
 Planetology – study of planets
 Plumology – study of feathers
 Plutology – political economy; study of wealth 
 Pneumatics – study of mechanics of gases 
 Pneumonology – study of diseases involving the respiratory tract
 Podiatry – study and treatment of disorders of the foot; chiropody 
 Podology – study of the feet 
 Polemology – study of war 
 Pomology – study of fruit-growing 
 Pogonology – study of beards 
 Posology – science of quantity or dosage 
 Potamology – study of rivers 
 Praxeology – study of practical or efficient activity; science of efficient action 
 Primatology – study of primates 
 Proctology – study of rectum, anus, and colon
 Prosody – study of versification 
 Protistology – study of protists 
 Proxemics – study of man's need for personal space 
 Psalligraphy – art of paper-cutting to make pictures 
 Psephology – study of election results and voting trends 
 Pseudology – art or science of lying 
 Pseudoptics – study of optical illusions 
 Psychobiology – study of biology of the mind 
 Psychogenetics – study of internal or mental states 
 Psychognosy – study of mentality, personality or character 
 Psychology – study of mind 
 Psychopathology – study of mental illness 
 Psychophysics – study of link between mental and physical processes 
 Pteridology – study of ferns 
 Pterylology – study of distribution of feathers on birds 
Punnology – study of puns
 Pyretology – study of fevers 
 Pyrgology – study of towers 
 Pyroballogy – study of artillery 
 Pyrography – study of woodburning
 Pyrotechnics – study of combustion through fire or explosions

Q 
 Quinology – study of quinine.
 Quantum computing – the exploitation of collective properties of quantum states, such as superposition and entanglement, to perform computation.
 Quantum mechanics – a fundamental theory in physics which describes nature at the smallest scales of energy levels of atoms and subatomic particles
 Queer theory – study of issues related to sexual orientation and gender identity

R 
 Raciology – study of racial differences
 Radiobiology – study of the scientific principles, mechanisms, and effects of the interaction of ionizing radiation with living matter
 Radiochemistry – study of ordinary chemical reactions under radioactive circumstances
 Radiology – study of X-rays and their medical applications                             
 Reflexology – study of reflexes 
 Rheology – science of the deformation or flow of matter 
 Rheumatology – study of rheumatism 
 Rhinology – study of the nose 
 Rhochrematics – science of inventory management and the movement of products
 Robotics – deals with the designing, construction, and operation of robots
 Runology – study of runes

S 
 Sarcology – study of fleshy parts of the body 
 Satanology – study of the devil 
 Scatology – study of excrement or obscene literature 
 Schematonics – art of using gesture to express tones 
 Sciagraphy – art of shading 
 Scripophily – collection of bond and share certificates 
 Sedimentology – study of sediment 
 Seismology – study of earthquakes 
 Selenodesy – study of the shape and features of the moon 
 Selenology – study of the moon 
 Semantics – study of meaning 
 Semantology – science of meanings of words 
 Semasiology – study of meaning; semantics 
 Semiology – study of signs and signals 
 Semiotics – study of signs and symbols 
 Serology – study of serums 
 Sexology – study of sexual behaviour 
 Siderology – study of iron and its alloys, including steel   
 Significs – science of meaning 
 Silvics – study of tree's life 
 Sindonology – study of the shroud of Turin 
 Sinology – study of China 
 Sitology – dietetics 
 Sociobiology – study of biological basis of human behaviour 
 Sociology – study of society 
 Solid mechanics – study of behaviour of solid materials
 Somatology – science of substances 
 Sophiology – science of ideas 
 Soteriology – study of theological salvation 
 Snow hydrology – study of snow
 Spectrology – study of ghosts 
 Spectroscopy – study of spectra 
 Speleology – study and exploration of caves 
 Spermology – study of seeds 
 Sphagnology – study of peat moss 
 Sphygmology – study of the pulse 
 Splanchnology – study of the entrails or viscera 
 Spongology – study of sponges 
 Stasiology – study of political parties 
 Statics – study of bodies and forces in equilibrium 
 Stellar astronomy – study of stars, their origins, and their evolution.
 Stemmatology – study of relationships between text
 Stereochemistry – study of chemistry of the relative spatial arrangement of atoms that form the structure of molecules and their manipulation. 
 Stoichiology – science of elements of animal tissues 
 Stomatology – study of the mouth 
 Storiology – study of folk tales 
 Stratigraphy – study of geological layers or strata 
 Stratography – art of leading an army 
 Stylometry – studying literature by means of statistical analysis 
 Suicidology – study of suicide 
 Supramolecular chemistry – study of the chemistry of assembled molecular sub-units
 Symbology – study of symbols 
 Symptomatology – study of symptoms of illness 
 Synecology – study of ecological communities 
 Synectics – study of processes of invention 
 Syntax – study of sentence structure 
 Syphilology – study of syphilis
 Systematics – study of the diversification of living forms, both past and present
 Systematology – study of systems

T 
 Taxidermy – art of curing and stuffing animals 
 Taxonomy – study of plant, animals and microorganisms classification
 Tectonics – science of structure of objects, buildings and landforms 
 Tegestology – study and collecting of beer mats 
 Teleology – study of final causes; analysis in terms of purpose 
 Telmatology – study of swamps 
 Tempestology – study of tropical cyclones, e.g. hurricanes 
 Teratology – study of birth defects and later abnormalities in living organisms
 Terrestrial ecology – study of terrestrial environment 
 Teuthology – study of cephalopods 
 Textology – study of the production of texts 
 Thalassography – science of the sea 
 Thanatology – study of death and its customs 
Thaumatology – study of miracles
 Theoretical computer science – science combining computer science and mathematics  
 Theriogenology – study of animals' reproductive systems 
 Thermodynamics – study of relation of heat to motion 
 Thermokinematics – study of motion of heat 
 Thermology – study of heat 
 Therology – study of wild mammals 
 Thremmatology – science of breeding domestic animals and plants 
 Threpsology – science of nutrition 
 Tidology – study of tides 
 Timbrology – study of postage stamps 
 Tocology – obstetrics; midwifery 
 Tokology – study of childbirth 
 Tonetics – study of pronunciation 
 Topography – study of the shape and features of land surfaces
 Topology – study of places and their natural features 
 Toponymics – study of place-names 
 Toreutics – study of artistic work in metal 
 Toxicology – study of poisons 
 Toxophily – love of archery; archery; study of archery 
 Traumatology – study of wounds and their effects 
 Tribology – study of friction and wear between surfaces 
 Trichology – study of hair and its disorders 
 Trophology – study of nutrition 
 Tsiganology – study of gypsies 
 Turbology – study of tornadoes 
 Turnery – art of turning in a lathe 
 Typhlology – study of blindness and the blind 
 Typography – art of printing or using type 
 Typology – study of types of things

U 
 Uranography – descriptive astronomy and mapping 
 Uranology – study of the heavens; astronomy 
 Urbanology – study of cities 
 Urenology – study of rust molds 
 Urology – study of urine and the urinary tract

V 
 Venereology – study of venereal disease
 Veterinary medicine – study of medicine in domesticated animals
 Vexillology – study of flags 
 Victimology – study of victims 
 Vinology – scientific study of vines and winemaking 
 Virology – study of viruses 
 Vitrics – study of glassy materials; glassware 
 Volcanology – study of volcanoes

X 
 Xenobiology – study of biological systems which do not exist in nature
 Xylography – art of engraving on wood 
 Xylology – study of wood

Z 
 Zenography – study of the planet Jupiter 
 Zooarchaeology – study of animal remains of archaeological sites 
 Zoochemistry – study of chemistry of animals 
 Zoogeography – study of geographic distribution of animals 
 Zoogeology – study of fossil animal remains 
 Zoology – study of animals 
 Zoonomy – animal physiology 
 Zoonosology – study of animal diseases 
 Zoopathology – study of animal diseases 
 Zoophysics – physics of animal bodies 
 Zoophysiology – study of physiology of animals 
 Zoophytology – study of plant-like animals 
 Zoosemiotics – study of animal communication 
 Zootaxy – science of classifying animals 
 Zootechnics – science of breeding animals 
 Zygology – science of joining and fastening 
 Zymology – science of fermentation 
 Zymurgy – branch of chemistry dealing with brewing and distilling
 Zythology – study of beer

See also
 List of words ending in ology
 List of sciences
 Science
 Outline of academic disciplines

References

Branches, science index
Science-related lists